The list of ship commissionings in 2009 includes a chronological list of all ships commissioned in 2009.


See also 

2009
 Ship commissionings